The purplish-backed jay (Cyanocorax beecheii) is a bird of the crow family Corvidae, with purple feathers on its back, wings and tail, and black feathers elsewhere. It is endemic to northwestern Mexico where its habitat is mainly dry deciduous forest. The International Union for Conservation of Nature has assessed it as being a "species of least concern".

Description
The purplish-backed jay is a purple and black bird with a powerful bill and a long tail. The head, neck, upper mantle and underparts are black, and there is a small ruffled, erectile crest on the forehead. The underside of the wings and the tail are also blackish, while the remainder of the plumage is purplish-blue, being brightest on the lower part of the mantle and the rump. The bill is black and the irises and legs are yellow.

Ecology

This jay forms small social groups consisting of an adult pair and up to three young from the previous year. They move through the forest using varying strategies to acquire the invertebrates and small vertebrates on which they feed; some insects are caught in mid air, others plucked off leaves, grubs are obtained by probing in bark and other prey by foraging through the plant litter. The birds are omnivorous and sometimes leave the forest to visit and feed in orchards, fields of grain, rubbish dumps and road verges.

They also mob and drive off predators. The birds pair for life, with pair bonding behaviours including various vocal displays, as well as mutual preening and the passing of food from one partner to the other. Although the group may contain more than one pair, only the dominant pair will normally nest in any one year. The female is assisted in building the nest by other members of the group. It is an untidy platform of twigs, and a clutch of about five eggs is laid in early May. The female incubates the eggs for about nineteen days, being fed by the male and sometimes other members of the group. The newly hatched chicks are fed by both parents and by other members of the group and fledge in about 24 days; juvenile males remain with the group for a year or so before dispersing while females may remain indefinitely with the group.

Status
The total population of the purplish-backed jay is thought to be declining inline with the degradation of the dry deciduous forest where it lives. However, the decline is gradual and it has a wide range, so the International Union for Conservation of Nature has assessed its conservation status as being of "least concern".

References

External links
Purplish-backed jay videos on the Internet Bird Collection

purplish-backed jay
Endemic birds of Western Mexico
purplish-backed jay
Birds of the Sierra Madre Occidental
Taxa named by Nicholas Aylward Vigors